Simhavalan Menon is a 1995 Indian Malayalam-language comedy film directed by Viji Thampi and written by Sasidharan Arattuvazhi. The film stars  Madhu, Jagadish, Urvashi and Jagathy Sreekumar in the lead roles.It is a remake of the 1979 Hindi film Gol Maal, of which some scenes were used in a previous Malayalam film Ayalvasi Oru Daridravasi (1986), directed by Priyadarsan, starring Mukesh and Prem Nazir in the corresponding roles. The film has musical score by S. P. Venkatesh.

Plot
Hariprasad, a young rock musician, is forced by his uncle to attend an interview at the firm owned by Simhavalan Menon as he feared that Hariprasad would waste his life on music and lacked purpose in life. His uncle gives him some pointers on how to impress Menon. He tells Hariprasad that Menon is a strict person, who upheld Gandhian values, likes Classical music and above all forced everyone in the office to speak in Malayalam without the use of any English words.

Hariprasad goes to the interview pretending to be a person with the above attributes, he is hired by Menon after being impressed by his attitude and tells him that it is very rare that he sees such values in young men. But one day Menon is shocked to see him among some Cricket fans after a match, as Hariprasad had earlier told Menon that he needed half day off to visit a relative who was seriously ill. An angry Menon confronts him in the office next day and tells him he was most disappointed by his behaviour. Hariprasad, on sensing that he might get fired, manages to convince Menon that whom he had seen was in fact his wayward twin brother Giriprasad, which was a total lie.

He tells Menon that his brother was a good painter and Menon asks him to get his brother to teach painting to his daughter, Geetanjali. Hariprasad goes as Giriprasad to Menon's house and falls in love with Geetanjali. Menon decides to marry her to Hariprasad and tells Giriprasad of his intentions. Hariprasad juggles between both the persona in the movie and tries in every possible way to not to let Menon know the truth.

Cast

Soundtrack
The music was composed by S. P. Venkatesh and the lyrics were written by Gireesh Puthenchery.

References

External links
 

1995 films
1990s Malayalam-language films
Malayalam remakes of Hindi films
Films directed by Viji Thampi